The canton of Erneé is an administrative division of the Mayenne department, northwestern France. Its borders were modified at the French canton reorganisation which came into effect in March 2015. Its seat is in Ernée.

It consists of the following communes:
 
Andouillé
La Baconnière
La Bigottière
Chailland
La Croixille
Ernée
Juvigné
Larchamp
Montenay
La Pellerine
Saint-Denis-de-Gastines
Saint-Germain-le-Guillaume
Saint-Hilaire-du-Maine
Saint-Pierre-des-Landes
Vautorte

References

Cantons of Mayenne